The 1804–05 United States Senate elections were held on various dates in various states. As these U.S. Senate elections were prior to the ratification of the Seventeenth Amendment in 1913, senators were chosen by state legislatures. Senators were elected over a wide range of time throughout 1804 and 1805, and a seat may have been filled months late or remained vacant due to legislative deadlock. In these elections, terms were up for the senators in Class 2.

These elections expanded the Democratic-Republican Party's overwhelming control over the Senate. The Federalists went into the elections with such a small share of Senate seats (9 out of 34, or 27%) that even if they had won every election, they would have still remained a minority caucus.

Results summary 
Senate party division, 9th Congress (1805–1807)

 Majority party: Democratic-Republican (27)
 Minority party: Federalist (7)
 Other parties: 0
 Total seats: 34

Change in composition 
Only reflects results of regular elections.

Before the regular elections

Result of the regular elections

Race summaries 
Except if/when noted, the number following candidates is the whole number vote(s), not a percentage.

Special elections during the 8th Congress 
In these special elections, the winner was seated during 1804 or before March 4, 1805; ordered by election date.

Races leading to the 9th Congress 

In these regular elections, the winner was seated on March 4, 1805; ordered by state.

All of the elections involved the Class 2 seats.

Special elections during the 9th Congress 
In this special election, the winner was seated in 1805 after March 4.

Delaware 

There were two elections this cycle to the same seat, because Federalist William H. Wells, who had first been elected in 1799, resigned November 6, 1804.

Delaware (regular) 

Federalist James A. Bayard was elected November 13, 1804, to finish the term ending the following March.

Delaware (special) 

Federalist James A. Bayard also elected in 1805, to the next term.

Georgia

Kentucky

Massachusetts

New Hampshire

New Jersey

New York (special) 

In February 1804 two senators were elected to finish vacant terms. The winner of the class 1 seat later resigned, leading to a November special election.

Theodorus Bailey had been elected to the Class 1 seat (term 1803-1809) but resigned on January 16, 1804, after his appointment as Postmaster of New York City.

John Armstrong had been re-elected to the class 3 seat to the term that would end March 3, 1807. He resigned February 5, 1802 and DeWitt Clinton was elected February 9, 1802 to finish the term.

Clinton then resigned on November 4, 1803, after his appointment as Mayor of New York City, and Governor George Clinton appointed Armstrong to his old seat to continue the term temporarily until another special election.

Armstrong was then elected to the class 1 seat and so resigned from the class 3 seat.

New York (February: special, classes 1 and 3) 

The first special election was held February 3, 1804, by the New York State Legislature to elect both senators. The class 1 term ended March 3, 1809 and the class 3 term ended March 3, 1813.

U.S. Senator (Class 1) Incumbent: Theodorus Bailey

U.S. Senator (Class 3) Incumbent: John Armstrong

John Smith was seated February 23, 1804. John Armstrong was seated February 25, 1804.

New York (November: special, class 1) 

Once again, John Armstrong resigned from the Senate on June 30, 1804 (a third time in three years) when appointed U.S. Minister to France. To fill the vacancy, the legislature held a special election November 9, 1804, and elected Samuel L. Mitchill.

Mitchill was seated November 23, 1804.

North Carolina

Rhode Island

Rhode Island (regular) 

Democratic-Republican James Fenner beat incumbent Democratic-Republican Christopher Ellery in 1804.

Rhode Island (special) 

Democratic-Republican Samuel J. Potter died October 14, 1804 Democratic-Republican Benjamin Howland was elected October 29, 1804 to finish the term.

South Carolina

South Carolina (regular) 

Democratic-Republican Thomas Sumter was re-elected December 6, 1804.

South Carolina (special) 

Democratic-Republican Pierce Butler resigned November 21, 1804 and Democratic-Republican John Gaillard was elected December 6, 1804.

Tennessee

Virginia 

The incumbent senators effectively switched seats due to appointments and special elections.

Class 2

Virginia (special, class 2) 

Democratic-Republican Wilson C. Nicholas resigned May 22, 1804 and Democratic-Republican Andrew Moore was appointed August 11, 1804 to continue the term.  Moore was elected to the other seat, so he resigned and Democratic-Republican William B. Giles, who had already been elected to this seat's next term, was elected December 4, 1804 to finish the term.

Virginia (regular, class 2) 

Democratic-Republican William B. Giles was elected December 4, 1804 to the next term.

Virginia (special, class 1) 

Democratic-Republican Abraham B. Venable resigned June 7, 1804 and Democratic-Republican William B. Giles was appointed August 11, 1804 to continue the term.  Giles was elected to the other seat, so he resigned and Democratic-Republican Andrew Moore was elected December 4, 1804 to finish the term.

See also 
 1804 United States elections
 1804 United States presidential election
 1804–05 United States House of Representatives elections
 8th United States Congress
 9th United States Congress

Notes

References 
 Party Division in the Senate, 1789-Present, via Senate.gov